Ozimops ridei is a species of molossid bat found in eastern Australia.

Taxonomy and etymology
A species of genus Ozimops, established to separate new species and generic combinations of Australian molossid bats.
The population has been described as a subspecies of Mormopterus loriae, Loria's mastiff bat.
In 2008, it was elevated for the first time to species rank—a view that was further corroborated in 2014 when a review of systematics and morphological characters of Australian Mormopterus was published. The generic combination of this species was inferred by the elevation of the subgenus to genus Ozimops.

The eponym for the species name "ridei" is likely William Ride, who was an accomplished Australian zoologist.

Description
Fur color is highly variable among individuals, with some bats a light brownish-gray while others are darker brown.

Biology and ecology
It is nocturnal, roosting in sheltered places during the day such as inside Eucalyptus tree hollows or in buildings.
It is insectivorous, often foraging near habitat edges.

Range and habitat
It occurs along much of the eastern coast of Australia.

Conservation
It is listed as least concern by the IUCN—its lowest conservation priority.
It meets the criteria for this category because it has a very large extent of occurrence, a large estimated area of occupancy, it uses a wide variety of habitats, and its range includes protected land.
However, the IUCN assessment does express uncertainty over its population trend; it is unknown if its population is stable or declining.

References

External links
Images of two individuals with transmitters attached
Occurrence map of this species

Mammals described in 1964
Bats of Australia
Ozimops